Evren, formerly Çıkınağıl, is a town and district of Ankara Province in the Central Anatolia region of Turkey, 178 km from the city of Ankara. According to 2010 census, population of the district is 3,343 of which 2,175 live in the town of Evren. The district covers an area of 218 km².
Since April 2009 this municipality is governed by the MHP.

Name
This small remote town on the banks of Hirfanlı reservoir, was formerly known as Çıkınağıl, and was renamed after Kenan Evren, former president of Turkey. In November 2019, Ak Party proposed renaming the city back to Çıkınağıl.

Villages in the district

Notes

References

External links
 District governor's official website 
 District municipality's official website 

 
Populated places in Ankara Province
Districts of Ankara Province